On 14 May 1961, during the American Civil Rights Movement, a mob bombed a bus filled with civil rights Freedom Riders when two buses were setting out to travel the south in protest of their civil rights following the Supreme Court case saying bus segregation was unconstitutional.

Bombing 

On Sunday, May 14, Mother's Day, in Anniston, Alabama, a mob of Klansmen, some still in church attire, attacked the first of the two Greyhound buses. The driver tried to leave the station, but he was blocked until Ku Klux Klan members slashed its tires. The mob forced the crippled bus to stop several miles outside town and then threw a firebomb into it. As the bus burned, the mob held the doors shut, intending to burn the riders to death. Sources disagree, but either an exploding fuel tank or an undercover state investigator who was brandishing a revolver caused the mob to retreat, and the riders escaped the bus. The mob beat the riders after they got out. Warning shots which were fired into the air by highway patrolmen were the only thing which prevented the riders from being lynched. The roadside site in Anniston and the downtown Greyhound station were preserved as part of the Freedom Riders National Monument in 2017.

Some injured riders were taken to Anniston Memorial Hospital. That night, the hospitalized Freedom Riders, most of whom had been refused care, were removed from the hospital at 2 AM, because the staff feared the mob outside the hospital. The local civil rights leader Rev. Fred Shuttlesworth organized several cars of black citizens to rescue the injured Freedom Riders in defiance of the white supremacists. The black people were under the leadership of Colonel Stone Johnson and were openly armed as they arrived at the hospital, protecting the Freedom Riders from the mob.

When the Trailways bus reached Anniston and pulled in at the terminal an hour after the Greyhound bus was burned, it was boarded by eight Klansmen. They beat the Freedom Riders and left them semi-conscious in the back of the bus.

See also 

 Birmingham bus attack

References

Sources

 
1961 in American politics
1961 protests
African-American history of Alabama
Bus transportation in the United States
Civil rights movement
Civil rights protests in the United States
Conflicts in 1961
 
History of African-American civil rights
History of the Southern United States
May 1961 events in North America